Gina G (born Gina Mary Gardiner, 3 August 1970) is an Australian singer who represented the United Kingdom at the Eurovision Song Contest in 1996, with the song "Ooh Aah... Just a Little Bit", which reached No. 1 in the UK Singles Chart. The song also reached the US top 20 in 1997 and earned her a 1998 Grammy Award nomination for Best Dance Recording. Her other UK Top 30 hits are "I Belong to You" #6 (1996), "Fresh" #6 (1997), "Ti Amo" #11 (1997) and "Gimme Some Love" #25 (1997).

Career

Early 1990s
Gina G was a DJ in Melbourne and a singer in the Australian dance music group Bass Culture. She appeared under the name Geena for a track she co-wrote with the group, "Love the Life", which was released in Australia in May 1992.

Mid to late 1990s
By 1995, she had moved to the UK, where she entered the A Song for Europe competition. She won, becoming the UK's entry in the 1996 Eurovision Song Contest, with the song "Ooh Aah... Just a Little Bit". The song finished in eighth place at Eurovision, and peaked at number one on the UK Singles Chart. The song was also successful in the US, reaching #12 on the Billboard Hot 100, #3 on the Hot Dance Club Play, #13 on the Rhythmic Top 40, #5 on the Mainstream Top 40, #25 on the Adult Top 40 and #11 on the Hot Dance Music/Maxi-Singles Sales chart. The song was nominated for a Grammy in the Best Dance Recording category in 1998.

Gina G released "I Belong to You" later in 1996, which was also a top 10 hit in the UK. The following year, she scored a succession of UK hits with "Fresh!", "Ti Amo", "Gimme Some Love", and "Everytime I Fall", all of which were included on her debut album Fresh!. The album's cover was shot by David LaChapelle and featured her whole body covered in chocolate. "Gimme Some Love" was also a hit in the US, reaching #46 on the Billboard Hot 100, #18 on both the Hot Dance Music/Club Play and Hot Dance Music/Maxi-Singles Sales charts, and #22 on the Top 40 Mainstream chart.

Following this, she disappeared from the music industry for several years. A long lawsuit against a former manager was reported as taking all her energy, and despite the fact that a lot of new music was recorded for a second album, she was prevented from releasing the material.

2000s
By 2000 she recorded a number of songs with Swedish producers Lagoona, including a new version of her debut hit "Ooh Aah... Just a Little Bit", and a cover of Nancy Sinatra's "These Boots Are Made for Walkin'". The latter was released as a CD single through a small independent label, but the release did not attract any major attention.

After this quiet period, G returned to the spotlight in March 2003, when she took part in the reality television show Reborn in the USA, alongside Sonia, Michelle Gayle, Tony Hadley, Peter Cox and Elkie Brooks. Even though she received the most votes from the American audience and won the first show, she got the fewest votes in the next show, and went up for the British public's vote. She lost, and was eliminated from the show in the third programme.

In early 2005, Gina G attempted to represent the United Kingdom at the Eurovision Song Contest, she finished fifth out of five entries on the pre-selection program with her song "Flashback". She competed against Javine and Katie Price.

In August, she released her second album, Get Up & Dance to good reviews. However the album was only available through her website, with the majority of first orders being personally signed by G.

In June 2006, her debut album, Fresh!, became available for download on iTunes. She set up her own record label, Stuntgirl, with distribution through Universal Records. Based in Los Angeles, she records in her own studio there as well as in London. In late 2006 she released a new single, "Tonight's the Night" and promoted it round the clubs and it went into the commercial dance chart at #2. It was released on 2 October through download and larger music stores. The single charted at #57 in the UK Singles Chart on 8 October.

In March 2009 her second album Get Up & Dance, previously only available through her website, was released on iTunes. The album had a new cover design.

2010s
Gina G released "Next 2 You" on 27 May 2011 to iTunes Australia. It was written by Gina G, Billy Pace, Duane Morrison, and John Collins. New remixes featuring rapper Vigilante were released in November 2011. A planned second single called 'Set the Night on Fire' was scheduled for early 2012 and a music video was planned, but ultimately both song and video were never released, and as of 2023 Gina G has not returned to musical activity.

Discography

Studio albums

Remix albums

Singles

Awards and nominations

ARIA Music Awards
The ARIA Music Awards is an annual awards ceremony that recognises excellence, innovation, and achievement across all genres of Australian music. They commenced in 1987.

! 
|-
|1997
| "(Ooh Aah) Just a Little Bit"
| ARIA Award for Breakthrough Artist - Single
| 
|
|-

See also
United Kingdom in the Eurovision Song Contest 1996

References

External links
"Fresh" on iTunes

1970 births
Living people
Australian expatriates in England
Australian expatriates in the United States
Eurovision Song Contest entrants for the United Kingdom
Eurovision Song Contest entrants of 1996
People from Brisbane
Australian dance musicians
G, Gina
Musicians from Brisbane
21st-century Australian singers
21st-century Australian women singers
Australian people of Cornish descent